Blaenavon Blues A.F.C. are a Welsh football club from the town of Blaenavon, Monmouthshire in south eastern Wales. Formed in 1947, they have played in the Welsh Football League. They currently play in the Ardal SE, the third tier of the Welsh football pyramid.

History
There has been many clubs in Blaenavon dating back to the 1900s. Most of these clubs had been church sides, and not one of the sides made an impact on a senior level. Clubs that represented the town included Blaenavon Thursday’s, Clapham United from Forge side, The Corinthians, and Garn–y-erw. There is also evidence of a Blaenavon side competing in the Usk & District league in 1936 to 1939.

Following the end of the Second World War, Blaenavon man Ernest Pugh founded Blaenavon Blues AFC in the summer of 1946. During the early years the club played in the local leagues. The 1960s saw an upturn in the club's achievements and in 1960 the club won a treble of cups, The Langdon, Benevolent and Peake Cups. Back to back Championship wins in 1960–61 and 1961–62 along with two more Langdon Cup wins and two Benevolent Cup wins saw the club dominate the Pontypool league. The club again won the league in 1966–67.

The club applied for admittance into the Gwent Senior and Welsh Football Leagues and were accepted, with the 1968–69 season seeing the Blues playing senior football for the first time in their history.

In 1972 former Busby babe Ken Morgans managed the team for a season. The following year saw the club finish third, and in 1974–75 the club finished as champions of the tier 3 Welsh Football League Division Two. The club spent the next three years in the second tier before being relegated. The club continued to play in the Welsh league until the end of the 1990–91 season when a decision was made to leave the league given the pending Welsh pyramid re-organisation.  After resignation from the league, the club dropped into the Gwent County League.

The 2021–22 season saw the club go unbeaten in the Gwent County Premier Division across 30 games but finish as runners-up on goal difference to Lliswerry, having scored 99 goals and conceded 22 goals. The runner-up spot entitled the club to promotion to the tier 3 Ardal Leagues pending the outcome of their tier three Certification application to the Football Association of Wales, which was awarded in May 2022.

Honours

Welsh Football League Division Two (Tier 3 of the Welsh Football League)
Champions (1): 1974–75
Gwent Central League
Division One – Champions (5): 1960–61, 1961–62, 1966–67, 1992–93, 1996–97
Division One – Runners-Up (2): 1965–66, 2007–08
Division Two – Champions: (1): 1989–90
Division Two – Runners-Up (2): 2002–03
Gwent County League
Premier Division – Runners-Up (1): 2021–22
Division One – Runners-Up (1): 2005–06
Division Two – Runners-Up (1): 2003–04
Division Three - Runners-Up (1): 2002–03
Gwent Senior League
Division Two - Champions (1): 1977–78
Gwent County FA Senior Cup
Winners – 2021–22
Pontypool League
Champions (3): 1960–61; 1961–62, 1966–67
The Langdon Cup
Winners (4): 1959–60, 1960–61; 1961–62, 2004–05
Runners-Up (1): 1953–54
Benevolent Cup
Winners (6): 1959–60, 1960–61; 1962–63, 1995–96; 2002–03; 2003–04
Runners-Up (2): 1964–65; 1966–67
E.I.Peake Cup
Winners (1): 1959–60
Open Cup
Winners (2): 1992–93; 2005–06
Runners-Up (1): 2007–08
Super Cup
Winners (1): 2005–06

Welsh Football League history
Information in this section is sourced from the Football Club History Database and the Welsh Soccer Archive.

Notes

References

External links
Club website

 
Football clubs in Wales
Sport in Monmouthshire
1946 establishments in Wales
Association football clubs established in 1946
Gwent County League clubs
Welsh Football League clubs
Ardal Leagues clubs